General Jayanto Nath Chaudhuri  (Bengali: জয়ন্তনাথ চৌধুরী; 10 June 1908 – 6 April 1983) was a General Officer in the Indian Army. He served as the 6th Chief of Army Staff from 1962 to 1966 and the Military Governor of Hyderabad State from 1948 to 1949. After his retirement from the Indian Army, he served as the Indian High Commissioner to Canada from 19 July 1966 until August 1969.

Family background and early life
Chaudhuri was born into an aristocratic Bengali Brahmin family which produced many lawyers and writers. His family were the Zamindars (landlords) of Haripur and the family was known as the Chaudhuris of Haripur in the province of Bengal, British India. Chaudhuri's paternal grandfather, Durgadas Chaudhuri, was the landlord of Chatmohar Upazila of Pabna district of present-day Bangladesh. His paternal grandmother, Sukumari Devi (wife of Durgadas), was a sister of the nobel laureate Rabindranath Tagore. Chaudhuri's mother, Pramila Chaudhuri, was the daughter of Womesh Chandra Bannerjee, who was the first president of the Indian National Congress.

Other members of Chaudhuri's family were also distinguished in their fields, mainly law, medicine and literature. All six of his father's elder brothers, namely Sir Ashutosh Chaudhuri (judge during the British Raj), Jogesh Chaudhuri, Kumudnath Chaudhuri (barrister), Pramathanath Chaudhuri (writer), Capt. Manmathanath Chaudhuri (first Indian surgeon-general of Madras Presidency) and Dr. Suhridnath Chaudhuri, were distinguished on their own right. Two of them (Sir Asutosh and Pramathanath) were married to their first cousins (mother's brother's daughters), the nieces of Rabindranath Tagore, and the others were married to women from Bengali families.

The Indian actress, Devika Rani, was Chaudhuri's first cousin, being the daughter of his father's brother, Manmathnath Chaudhuri.  Among Chaudhuri's other close relatives were Barrister Kumud Nath Chaudhuri and Raisahib Babu Narendra Krishna Talukdar, Zamindar of Maligacha and honorary first class magistrate for Pabna District, Rajshahi. Writer Pramatha Chaudhuri, who married a niece of Nobel laureate poet Rabindranath Tagore, was his uncle.

Education
Chaudhuri completed his early education in Pataldanga Academy (Now known as Hare School) in Calcutta.
Later he studied at St. Xavier's College (University of Calcutta). He also studied at Highgate School in London, from May 1923 until July 1926, and the Royal Military College, Sandhurst. At Sandhurst, he got his nickname, "Muchhu" (owing to his moustache). Ayub Khan, who became President of Pakistan in 1958, was one of the batch-mates of Jayanto in Sandhurst; Ayub was in the same platoon where Jayanto was trained.

Military career

Early career
He was commissioned from Sandhurst as a second lieutenant onto the Unattached List, Indian Army on 2 February 1928. Returning to India, he was attached to the 1st battalion North Staffordshire Regiment from 19 March 1928. He was accepted for the Indian Army and joined the 7th Light Cavalry on 19 March 1929. In 1934, he attended the course at the Equitation School, Saugor. He attended the Staff course at Command and Staff College, Quetta from December 1939 to June 1940.

In 1940, as an acting major, he went overseas on the staff of the 5th Infantry Division and saw service in Sudan, Eritrea, Abyssinia and the western deserts of Africa. For his services, he was Mentioned in Dispatches on 30 December 1941, for distinguished services in the Middle East Feb to July 1941, and again on 30 June 1942 for the same from July to October 1941. He was awarded the OBE on 18 February 1943 for gallant and distinguished services in the Middle East between May to Oct 1942. Recalled to India, he was appointed as a senior Instructor at the Command and Staff College, Quetta as a GSO-1 in 1943.

In August 1944 he was transferred to the 16th Light Cavalry. Then a temporary Lieut-Colonel, he commanded this unit from September 1944 to October 1945 in Burma for which he was twice more Mentioned in Dispatches, (London Gazette 9/5/46) for gallant and distinguished services in Burma (Temporary Lt-Col 16th Light Cavalry) and (London Gazette 17/9/46) for gallant and distinguished services in Burma (Temporary Lt-Col, Indian Armoured Corps). At the end of the Burma campaign, he saw service in French Indochina and in Java, Indonesia with his regiment.

In 1946, he was promoted to the temporary rank of Brigadier with the war-substantive rank of lieutenant-colonel, in Charge of Administration in British Malaya and in the same year was selected to command the Indian Victory Contingent to London.

Post-Independence career
Following a course at the Imperial Defence College in London in 1947, he returned to India and was appointed Director of Military Operations & Intelligence at Army Headquarters in New Delhi in November 1947.
Chaudhuri worked with Major General Mohite to complete military evacuation from Pakistan. He had to organise the Kashmir war effort up to May 1948, when he was succeeded by the then Brig. Sam Manekshaw as DMO and Chand Narayan Das as Director of Military Intelligence.
In February 1948, he was promoted to acting Major General and became the officiating Chief of the General Staff.

In May 1948, he took over command of the 1st Armoured Division which played a major role in the 1948 Hyderabad Operations. Following Operation Polo in 1948, he was appointed as the Military Governor of Hyderabad State. In the years following, he occupied important military posts and led an Indian Military Delegation to China. In 1949, he was appointed as the first Colonel Commandant of the Electrical & Mechanical Engineers, and was promoted to substantive brigadier on 1 January 1950. In January 1952, he was appointed as the Adjutant General, Army HQ, as a substantive major-general, and in January 1953, he again took over as the Chief of the General Staff. He was promoted to local lieutenant-general on 16 December 1955 and given command of a corps, with promotion to substantive lieutenant-general on 8 May 1957. He was appointed GOC-in-C Southern Command on 25 May 1959.

Chief of the Army staff
The debacle of the Sino-Indian War and subsequent government inquiries revealing India's military unpreparedness and mismanagement resulted in the Chief of the Army Staff (COAS) Pran Nath Thapar's resignation on 19 November 1962. On 20 November, Chaudhuri succeeded Thapar as officiating COAS with the acting rank of general. Chaudhuri was officially appointed COAS on 20 February 1963, and was promoted to substantive general on 20 July 1963. In March 1964, he was decorated with the Grand Cordon of the Order of Merit of the United Arab Republic by its President, Gamal Abdel Nasser.

Chaudhari was COAS during the Indo-Pakistani War of 1965, generally regarded as a victory for India.

Chaudhari is regarded as one of the founding fathers of the Border Security Force. In the aftermath of the 1965 war, he proposed a paramilitary force to patrol the Indo-Pakistani border in peacetime and would be relieved by the army when war was imminent. For his services to the nation, he was presented with the Padma Vibhushan – India's second highest civilian honour — by the President of India. He retired on 7 June 1966, after completing 38 years of military service.

Diplomatic career
After his retirement, Chaudhuri was appointed High Commissioner of India to Canada. After a three year stint at the High Commission of India at Ottawa, he relinquished office, handing over to A. B. Bhadkamkar in August 1969.

Later years and legacy
Chaudhuri wrote two books on military matters and served as a literary reviewer for a leading Indian daily The Statesman. He was the first Indian army chief to write an autobiography in 1979. He loved Western music and founded and was first president of the Delhi Symphony Society, an organisation that promoted Western music. Chaudhuri was married to Karuna Chattopadhyay, with whom he had two sons.

Chaudhuri died at his home in Pamposh Enclave, New Delhi of a cardiac arrest on 6 April 1983, and was survived by his wife and two sons. His funeral and cremation the following day, with full military honours, was attended by hundreds of serving and retired officers and soldiers, including his fellow Chiefs of Staff, Admiral A. K. Chatterji and Air Chief Marshal Arjan Singh.  In his honour, the BSF awards its best infantry battalion with the GEN. J. N. Chaudhuri trophy annually.

Awards and decorations

Dates of rank

See also
Indian Army

Notes

References

 Pradeep P. Barua, Gentlemen of the Raj: The Indian Army Officer Corps, 1817–1949

External links
http://www.archives.lib.soton.ac.uk/mbindex/index179.shtml

Indian Army Bio

1908 births
1983 deaths
Indian generals
Chiefs of Army Staff (India)
Bengali Hindus
Military personnel from Kolkata
Recipients of the Padma Vibhushan in civil service
University of Calcutta alumni
Indian Army personnel of World War II
People educated at Highgate School
Graduates of the Royal Military College, Sandhurst
Officers of the Order of the British Empire
British Indian Army officers
People from Pabna District
Military personnel of the Indo-Pakistani War of 1965
Generals of the Indo-Pakistani War of 1965
Graduates of the Royal College of Defence Studies
Indian Officers of the Order of the British Empire